Sterckx is a surname. People with the surname include:
 Arlette Sterckx (born 1964), Belgian television actress
 Dirk Sterckx (born 1946), Belgian politician
 Els Sterckx (born 1972), Belgian-Flemish politician
 Engelbert Sterckx (1792–1867), Belgian archbishop
 Ernest Sterckx (1922–1975), Belgian professional racing cyclist
 Leo Sterckx (1936–2023), Belgian cyclist
 Nina Sterckx (born 2002), Belgian weightlifter
 René Sterckx (born 1991), Belgian professional football player
 Roel Sterckx (born 1969), Flemish-British sinologist and anthropologist